Pacific Street Films is a documentary film production company founded in Brooklyn, New York in 1969 by Joel Sucher and Steven Fischler. They have produced more than 100 films.

In 2004 the Museum of Modern Art hosted a career retrospective on Pacific Street Films.

Filmography

References

Further reading

External links

American companies established in 1969
Mass media companies established in 1969
1969 establishments in New York City
Documentary film production companies
Film production companies of the United States
Companies based in Brooklyn
Culture of Brooklyn